Flavius Dănuț Croitoru (born 13 July 1992) is a Romanian professional footballer who plays as a goalkeeper for Liga I club CS Mioveni. In his career, Croitoru also played in more than 115 league matches for CS Mioveni.

References

External links
 
 

1992 births
Living people
Sportspeople from Pitești
Romanian footballers
Association football goalkeepers
Liga I players
Liga II players
FC Argeș Pitești players
CS Mioveni players